The men's 10,000 metres at the 2015 Asian Athletics Championships was held on June 6.

Medalists

Records

Results

References
Results

10000
10,000 metres at the Asian Athletics Championships